Pians also refers to the alumni association composed of St. Pius X Seminary and Sancta Maria Mater et Regina Seminarium alumni.

Pians is a municipality in the district of Landeck in the Austrian state of Tyrol located 4.3 km west of the city of Landeck. The main source of income is tourism.

References

External links

Cities and towns in Landeck District